The 1971 Delaware State Hornets football team represented Delaware State College—now known as Delaware State University—as a member of the Mid-Eastern Athletic Conference (MEAC) in the 1971 NCAA College Division football season. This was their first season as a member of the newly formed MEAC. Led by fifth-year head coach Arnold Jeter, the Hornets compiled an overall record of 1–8 and a mark of 1–5 in conference play, tying for sixth in the MEAC. The team played most of the season with mainly freshmen and sophomores, as many veteran players were suspended after being involved in a drug scandal.

Schedule

References

Delaware State
Delaware State Hornets football seasons
Delaware State Hornets football